Flamingo is the debut solo studio album by American singer-songwriter and The Killers lead singer Brandon Flowers. It was released on September 3, 2010, by Island Records. It was recorded at Battle Born Studios in Winchester, Nevada, and Henson Recording Studios in Hollywood, California.  The album debuted at number one on the UK Albums Chart.

Background
After a mysterious countdown on The Killers' official website, Flowers confirmed on April 29, 2010, that he would be releasing a solo album titled Flamingo.  The album is named after Flamingo Road in Brandon's hometown of Las Vegas, where many pivotal events in his life occurred: Sam's Town Casino is on Flamingo, his first job was at a golf course on that road, and he met his wife in a thrift store on the road as well. (Although there is also a Flamingo Casino, Flowers has stated that it was not the inspiration for the title.)

Many songs on the album include references to Las Vegas. The track "Welcome to Fabulous Las Vegas" references Las Vegas Boulevard ("The Strip"). "Was It Something I Said?" references Tropicana Avenue and a job at the Golden Nugget Las Vegas located on the Fremont Street Experience. Track "Magdalena" references a 60-mile pilgrimage from Nogales to Magdalena in Sonora, Mexico.

Recording
The album was recorded primarily at Battle Born Studios in Winchester, Nevada. It was produced and mixed by Stuart Price, Daniel Lanois, and Brendan O'Brien. "Hard Enough" features a duet with Rilo Kiley frontwoman Jenny Lewis. "Fabulous Las Vegas" features bandmate Dave Keuning, while "Playing with Fire" features bandmate Ronnie Vannucci, Jr.

Promotion

The album's lead single "Crossfire" was premiered in the United Kingdom on Zane Lowe's BBC Radio 1 show on June 14, 2010. "Crossfire" was released soon after on June 21, 2010, in the United States and Canada via iTunes, and on August 23, 2010, in the United Kingdom. "Swallow It" was released as a promotional track from the album on August 24, 2010, via iTunes. "Only the Young" was released as the album's second single on October 12, 2010. An accompanying music video—filmed at Le Rêve at Wynn Las Vegas—premiered online on October 5, 2010, and was directed by Sophie Muller, who worked on the American video for "Mr. Brightside".

Flowers performed "Crossfire" on Alan Carr: Chatty Man on September 1, 2010, and on The Tonight Show with Jay Leno on September 13. On September 6, 2010, Flowers played a 10-song set at Maida Vale Studios on BBC Radio 1. He performed both "Crossfire" and "Magdalena" on Jimmy Kimmel Live! on September 14, 2010, and on Live from Abbey Road on July 20, 2011. Flowers appeared on Later with Jools Holland on September 21, 2010, performing "Crossfire", "Only the Young", and "Magdalena".

Critical reception

Flamingo received mixed reviews from music critics. At Metacritic, which assigns a normalized rating out of 100 to reviews from mainstream publications, the album received an average score of 59, based on 25 reviews. musicOMH published a positive review stating, "It's clear from Flamingo that Flowers accounts for the lion's share of talent in The Killers, and if they ever go on definite hiatus, their fans can look forward to more consistently good material in the form of Flowers' solo albums." Jody Rosen of Rolling Stone described Flowers' penchant for weaving beautiful losers into his songs by stating, "It would be laughable if Flowers wasn't 100 percent committed, and if the hooks on Flamingo weren't irresistible. He is, and they are - and you'll be too busy singing along to giggle." Alix Buscovic of BBC compared tracks "Welcome to Fabulous Las Vegas" and "Crossfire" to stadium albums Sam's Town and Day & Age and tracks "Magdalena" and "Was It Something I Said?" to 80s pop sensibility album Hot Fuss. Ryan Dombal for The Village Voice described Flowers as "a combination of Bono's brassiness, Morrissey's high drama, and Ian Curtis's spasmodic awkwardness, the singer represents an endangered species in 2010: a genuine arena-ready rock-'n'-roll deity who, at 29, isn't yet on blood thinners."

The album was ranked number thirty on Qs list of the 50 Best Albums of 2010.

Commercial performance
On the UK Albums Chart, the album debuted at the number-one spot on September 12 and remained on the chart for 14 weeks. As of May 2015, the album had sold 263,681 copies in the United Kingdom.

On the US Billboard 200, Flamingo debuted at number eight, with 41,000 copies sold and remained on the chart for eight weeks. The album has sold 137,000 copies in the US as of May 2015.

The single "Crossfire" reached the top 10 on the UK Singles Chart, Irish Singles Chart, Belgium Singles Chart (Flanders), and Billboards Alternative Songs chart.

Covers
In 2015, Martin Gore of Depeche Mode covered "On the Floor" at a benefit with his son in Santa Barbara.

Track listing

Personnel
Credits adapted from the liner notes of the deluxe edition of Flamingo.

Musicians

 Brandon Flowers – vocals ; synth  arrangement ; piano ; guitar 
 Stuart Price – synth ; guitar ; arrangement, slide guitar ; programming ; bass 
 Benji Lysaght – guitar ; 12-string electric guitar ; electric guitar ; pedal steel 
 Daniel Lanois – guitar ; pedal steel, dub sonics ; Omnichord 
 Dave Keuning – guitar 
 Brendan O'Brien – timpani, guitar, tubular bells ; bass, acoustic guitar, backing vocals ; tambourine, shaker ; electric guitar ; castanet, hurdy-gurdy ; bells, B-3, percussion 
 Victor Indrizzo – drums 
 Ronnie Vannucci Jr. – arrangement ; drums, percussion 
 Jenny Lewis – vocals 
 Darren Beckett – drums ; percussion ; additional drums 
 Herschel Gaer – acoustic guitar ; bass 
 The Las Vegas Mass Choir – backing vocals 
 Jake Blanton – acoustic guitar, piano, backing vocals 
 Daniel de los Reyes – percussion 
 Donald E. Chaney – backing vocals 
 James R. Smith – backing vocals 
 LaMont Brown – backing vocals 
 Veronica "Lady V" Morton – backing vocals

Technical

 Brendan O'Brien – production ; mixing 
 Tom Syrowski – recording 
 Martin Cooke – recording assistance 
 Nicolas Essig – recording assistance 
 Peter Stanislaus – recording assistance 
 Stuart Price – mixing ; production 
 Robert Root – recording ; additional recording ; recording assistance 
 Josh Baker – recording assistance 
 Daniel Lanois – production 
 Brandon Flowers – production 
 Tim Young – mastering

Artwork
 Williams + Hirakawa – cover and interior photography
 Lucy Hamblin – cover and interior photography
 Warren Fu – art direction, label artwork, graphic design
 Kristen Yiengst – art and photography coordination

Charts

Weekly charts

Year-end charts

Certifications

Release history

See also
 List of UK Albums Chart number ones of the 2010s

Notes

References

2010 debut albums
Albums produced by Brendan O'Brien (record producer)
Albums produced by Daniel Lanois
Albums produced by Stuart Price
Brandon Flowers albums
Island Records albums
Vertigo Records albums